The Portland Pilots women's soccer team represents the University of Portland in National Collegiate Athletic Association Division I women's soccer. The team competes in the West Coast Conference and is currently coached by Michelle French. The Pilots won national championships in 2002 and 2005.

All-Time Coaching Records

Year-by-year statistical leaders

References

External links
 Official website

 
women's
Pilots
1980 establishments in Oregon
Association football clubs established in 1980